Switzerland has eighteen official natural parks (and three candidate parks) classified in three categories (national parks, regional nature parks and nature experience parks).

Categories 

The three categories of natural "parks of national importance" established by the Federal Act on the Protection of Nature and Cultural Heritage (section 3b) are national parks, regional nature parks and nature experience parks.

National parks and nature experience parks have very strict protected areas, something which does not exist in regional nature parks. The latter focus much more on striking a balance in the level of support between nature conservation and the regional economy.

List of nature parks in Switzerland 

As of 2016, the eighteen official nature "parks of national importance" in Switzerland are:
 National parks (1)
 Swiss National Park
 Regional nature parks (16)
 Aargau Jura Park
 Beverin Nature Park
 Binntal Nature Park
 Chasseral Nature Park
 Diemtigtal Nature Park
 Doubs Nature Park
 Parc Ela
 UNESCO Entlebuch Biosphere
 Gantrisch Nature Park
 Gruyère Pays-d'Enhaut Nature Park
 Jura vaudois Nature Park
 Pfyn-Finges Nature Park
 Thal Nature Park
 Val Müstair Biosphere
 Nature experience parks (1)
 Wildnispark Zurich Sihlwald
 Candidate national parks
 Parc Adula
 Locarnese National Park Project
 Candidate regional nature park
 Schaffhausen Regional Nature Park

Nature reserves 

The environmental organisation Pro Natura takes care of about 650 nature reserves of various sizes throughout Switzerland (250 square kilometres).

See also 
 Environmental movement in Switzerland
 Federal Inventory of Landscapes and Natural Monuments
 Federal Office for the Environment
 World Network of Biosphere Reserves in Europe and North America
 List of nature parks in Germany

References

External links 
 
 
 
 

Switzerland
Parks in Switzerland